In Greek mythology, Telecleia (Ancient Greek: Τηλέκλεια) was a Trojan princess as the daughter of King Ilus of Troy and possibly, Eurydice or Leucippe. She was the (half) sister of Laomedon, Tithonius and Themiste. Telecleia married King Cisseus of Thrace and therefore, the mother of Theano, wife to Antenor, and also a possible mother of Hecuba.

Notes

References 

 Apollodorus, The Library with an English Translation by Sir James George Frazer, F.B.A., F.R.S. in 2 Volumes, Cambridge, MA, Harvard University Press; London, William Heinemann Ltd. 1921. ISBN 0-674-99135-4. Online version at the Perseus Digital Library. Greek text available from the same website.
 Gaius Julius Hyginus, Fabulae from The Myths of Hyginus translated and edited by Mary Grant. University of Kansas Publications in Humanistic Studies. Online version at the Topos Text Project.
Trojans

Princesses in Greek mythology
Queens in Greek mythology